Muruvika or Muruvik is a village in the municipality of Malvik in Trøndelag county, Norway. The village is located near the end of the Stjørdalsfjorden, an arm of the Trondheimsfjord.

The European route E6 highway used to pass through the village, but the highway now goes through the Hell Tunnel just south of Muruvika.  The Meråker Line railway also passes through the village.

References

Villages in Trøndelag
Malvik